John Louis may refer to:

John Louis, Count of Nassau-Saarbrücken (1472–1545), posthumous son of Count John II
John Louis of Elderen (1620–1694), bishop of Liège
John Louis, Count of Nassau-Ottweiler (1625–1690)
John Louis I, Prince of Anhalt-Dornburg (1656–1704), German prince
John Louis II, Prince of Anhalt-Zerbst (1688–1746), German prince
Sir John Louis, 2nd Baronet (1785–1863), admiral in the Royal Navy
John J. Louis Jr. (1925–1995), American businessman and ambassador to the United Kingdom
John Louis (speedway rider) (born 1941), English motorcycle racer
John Jeffry Louis III (born 1963), British businessman

See also
John Lewis (disambiguation)